Old Man River may refer to:

 A personification of the Mississippi River in the United States
 Old Man River (musician) (born 1979), Israeli singer-songwriter
 "Ol' Man River", a 1927 song from the musical Show Boat
 "Old Man River (I've Come to Talk Again)", a song by Reba McEntire on the 1982 album Unlimited

See also
 Oldman River